The Leonard-Cushing Fight is an 1894 American short black-and-white silent film produced by William K.L. Dickson, starring Mike Leonard and Jack Cushing. Leonard and Cushing participate in a six round boxing match under special conditions that allow for it to be filmed and displayed on a Kinetograph. Premiered on August 4, 1894 in Manhattan, the movie is the first sports film ever released. As of 2021, no full print of the film is known to have survived, making it a partially lost film.

Plot
The boxers Mike Leonard and Jake Cushing participate in a six round exhibition boxing bout. According to Terry Ramsaye, the fighters "[...] went six savage, abbreviated rounds of desperate fighting. In the sixth round Cushing, trapped by a feint, dropped his guard and stopped a swift right and left chop to the jaw." The film ends with Leonard knocking out Cushing.

Cast
 Michael Wellington Leonard (credited as Mike Leonard)
 Jack Cushing

Background and production

In 1888, Thomas Edison became interested in developing a motion-picture device. Edison appointed his company's photographer William K.L. Dickson with the development of such a device. Dickson, alongside his assistant Charles Brown started to work on different concepts the following year. Alongside William Heise, the company experimented with recording boxing bouts in spring 1891. Twelve feet of film were shot either in May or June 1891, featuring two of Edison Manufacturing Company employees, pretending to spar in a boxing ring. In a May 1891 interview with The Sun Edison announced his desire to display prize fights through his Kinetescope; "To the sporting fraternity I can say that before that before long it will be possible to apply this system to prize fights and boxing exhibitions." The Kinetescope had its world premiere on May 9, 1893, in the Brooklyn Institute of Arts and Sciences. Further development of motion picture devices led to the first private Kinetescope parlor opening in April the following year. Edison's business partners, Otway and Grey Latham, Enoch J. Rector, and Samuel J. Tilden Jr., sought to commercialize the popularity of the device. The group chose prizefighting as an easy subject to capture, but the Kinetescope needed further development to properly display a fight.

According to film historian Gordon Hendricks, preparation for filming might have begun as early as May 24, 1894. Heise and Dickson experimented with various New York based boxers, namely Kid Lavigne, Young Griffo and Jack McAuliffe, who all dropped out of the project. He later received  ( in 2021) and all of his expenses were paid. The team had to wait several days for clear weather, as the studio required natural light. The fight was watched by Edison and six unnamed partners. It is uncertain how many rounds were actually recorded. A June 16 account published in the New York World speaks of six rounds, while The Sun and Ramsaye claim ten recorded rounds. Further disagreement is about how much film was actually recorded. Hendricks calls Ramsaye claim of ten rounds an error. No matter the actual length, the film was the longest ever taken at the time. Cushing told the New York World that fighting in front of a Kinetescope is not a real fight. Leonard told the paper that he: "generally hit 'im in the face, because I felt sorry for his family and thought I would select only place that couldn't be disfigured. It's lucky the rounds lasted only a minute, for while I tried to spare him, of course I couldn't keep all my strength in." Leonard later recounted that Edison treated him right and that he "didn’t want to be too quick for his machine."

Release and reception

The Leonard-Cushing Fight premiered on August 4, 1894, in a Kinetescope parlor owned by the Latham's brother Kinetoscope Exhibiting Company in 83 Nassau Street (Manhattan). The film was sold by the round, for five cents each. Accorind to Ramsaye, "throngs packed the place and by the second day two long lines of waiting patrons trailed back  into the street on either side of the entrance. The police came to keep order in the queue." Gamauche claims that "the relative obscurity of the fighters, both of whom were from Brooklyn, and the fact that viewers could opt to pay for only the knockout round contributed to the lack of success of the Lathams’ parlor." Other screenings were in 457 Fulton Street (Brooklyn). On April 2, 1895, the Continental Commerce Company premiered the film in London's 70 Oxford Street.

As part of a pre-1900 film exhibition, the British National Film Theatre screened the surviving part on three occasions; November 21, 28 and December 12, 1994.

Legal issues
The state of New Jersey outlawed prize fights in 1835. According to an article published in The Sun on June 16, 1894, New Jersey's grand jury investigated a potential prize fight in Edison's studio. However, no record of the investigation exists. 

Legal status
According to the Library of Congress, the film was never copyrighted by Edison. It received the fragment by Louise G. Ernst. The website of the Library Congress lists Hendricks as the source of the 37-second fragment.

See also
 List of incomplete or partially lost films

Notes

Footnotes

References

Articles

Books

Journals

External links
 

1894 films
American boxing films
American silent short films
American black-and-white films
Documentary films about boxing
Films directed by William Kennedy Dickson
Films shot in New Jersey
Thomas Edison
Edison Manufacturing Company films
1890s sports films
1890s short documentary films
American short documentary films
Articles containing video clips
1890s American films
Silent sports films